Secret File: Hollywood is a 1962 American crime drama film directed by Rudolph Cusumano, and starring Robert Clarke, Francine York, Sydney Mason, Maralou Gray, and John Warburton. The film marks the onscreen debut of Francine York. The film was released by Crown International Pictures on June 6, 1962.

Plot

Cast
Robert Clarke as Maxwell Carter
Francine York as Nan Torr
Sydney Mason as Hap Grogan
Maralou Gray as Gay Shelton
John Warburton as Jimmy Cameron
Bill White
William Justine
Martha Mason
Barbara Skyler
Eleanor Ames
Kathy Potter
John Herman Shaner as Reed
Diane Strom
Selime Najjar as Selime
Shirley Chandler as Jazz Dancer
Maya Del Mar as Flamenco Dancer
Carolyn Brandt as Dancer (uncredited)
Arch Hall Sr. as TV director (uncredited)
Bill McKinney as Jimmy's Assistant Director (uncredited)

References

External links

1962 crime drama films
1962 films
American crime drama films
Crown International Pictures films
1960s English-language films
1960s American films